Thomas Crompton was an English politician who sat in the House of Commons at various times between 1647 and 1660.

Crompton was the son of Sir Thomas Crompton of Stafford. He subscribed at the University of Oxford on 1 July 1614 and was called to the bar at Lincoln's Inn in 1621.

In 1647, Crompton was elected Member of Parliament for Staffordshire in the Long Parliament and survived Pride's Purge to sit in the Rump Parliament. He was elected MP for Staffordshire again in 1654 for the First Protectorate Parliament, in 1656 for he Second Protectorate Parliament and in 1659 for the Third Protectorate Parliament. He was also restored in 1659 as a member of the Rump Parliament.

References

Year of birth missing
Year of death missing
Alumni of the University of Oxford
Members of Lincoln's Inn
Place of birth missing
English MPs 1640–1648
English MPs 1648–1653
English MPs 1654–1655
English MPs 1656–1658
English MPs 1659